Kurtuvėnai Manor was a residential manor in Kurtuvėnai, Lithuania. Kurtuvėnai Manor barn is built with unique project without using any nails.

Gallery

References

Manor houses in Lithuania
Classicism architecture in Lithuania